Rhode Island elected its members August 27, 1829 after the term began but before Congress convened.

See also 
 1828 and 1829 United States House of Representatives elections
 List of United States representatives from Rhode Island

1829
Rhode Island
United States House of Representatives